Kim Sang-jin may refer to:
 Kim Sang-jin (film director)
 Kim Sang-jin (footballer)
 Kim Sang-jin (politician), a member of the 5th Supreme People's Assembly of North Korea